The northern region of Europe has several definitions. A restrictive definition may describe Northern Europe as being roughly north of the southern coast of the Baltic Sea, which is about 54°N, or may be based on other geographical factors such as climate and ecology.

Climate

The climate is mainly Oceanic climate (Cfb), Humid continental climate (Dfb), Subarctic climate (Dfc and Dsc) and Tundra (ET).

Geography

Northern Europe might be defined roughly to include some or all of the following areas: British Isles, Fennoscandia, the peninsula of Jutland, the Baltic plain that lies to the east, and the many islands that lie offshore from mainland Northern Europe and the main European continent. In some cases, Greenland is also included, although it is only politically European, comprising part of the Kingdom of Denmark, and not considered to be geographically in Europe.

The area is partly mountainous, including the northern volcanic islands of Iceland and Jan Mayen, and the mountainous western seaboard, Scotland and Scandinavia, and also often includes part of the large plain east of the Baltic sea.

The entire region's climate is at least mildly affected by the Gulf Stream. From the west climates vary from maritime and maritime subarctic climates. In the north and central climates are generally subarctic or Arctic and to the east climates are mostly subarctic and temperate/continental.

Just as both climate and relief are variable across the region, so too is vegetation, with sparse tundra in the north and high mountains, boreal forest on the north-eastern and central regions temperate coniferous forests (formerly of which a majority was in the Scottish Highlands and south west Norway) and temperate broadleaf forests growing in the south, west and temperate east.

Classifications
There are various definitions of Northern Europe which often include the British Isles, the Nordic countries and the Baltic states and sometimes Greenland, northern Germany, northern Belarus and northwest Russia.

UN geoscheme classification

The United Nations geoscheme is a system devised by the United Nations Statistics Division (UNSD) which divides the countries of the world into regional and subregional groups, based on the M49 coding classification. The partition is for statistical convenience and does not imply any assumption regarding political or other affiliation of countries or territories.

In the UN geoscheme, the following countries are classified as Northern Europe:
 Denmark
 Estonia
 Finland
 Iceland
 Ireland
 Latvia
 Lithuania
 Norway
 Sweden
 United Kingdom

as well as the dependent areas:
 Åland
 Channel Islands
 Bailiwick of Guernsey
 Bailiwick of Jersey
 Faroe Islands
 Isle of Man
 Svalbard and Jan Mayen

EuroVoc

EuroVoc is a multilingual thesaurus maintained by the Publications Office of the European Union, giving definitions of terms for official use. In the definition of "Northern Europe", the following countries are included:
Estonia
Latvia
Lithuania
Denmark
Finland
Iceland
Norway
Sweden
as well as the dependent area:
Faroe Islands
In this classification Jersey, Guernsey, the Isle of Man, the United Kingdom and Ireland are included in Western Europe.

CIA World Factbook

In the CIA World Factbook, the description of each country includes information about "Location" under the heading "Geography", where the country is classified into a region. The following countries are included in their classification "Northern Europe":
Denmark
Finland
Iceland
Norway
Sweden
as well as the dependent areas:
Faroe Islands 
Jan Mayen
Svalbard
In this classification Jersey, Guernsey, the Isle of Man, the United Kingdom and Ireland are included in Western Europe, while Estonia, Latvia and Lithuania are included in Eastern Europe.

World Geographical Scheme for Recording Plant Distributions

The World Geographical Scheme for Recording Plant Distributions is a biogeographical system developed by the international Biodiversity Information Standards (TDWG) organization, formerly the International Working Group on Taxonomic Databases. The WGSRPD standards, like other standards for data fields in botanical databases, were developed to promote "the wider and more effective dissemination of information about the world's heritage of biological organisms for the benefit of the world at large". The system provides clear definitions and codes for recording plant distributions at four scales or levels, from "botanical continents" down to parts of large countries. The following countries are included in their classification of "Northern Europe":
Denmark
Finland
Iceland
Ireland
Norway
Sweden
United Kingdom
as well as the dependent areas:
Åland
Faroe Islands
Isle of Man
Jan Mayen
Svalbard

Demographics
Countries in Northern Europe generally have developed economies and some of the highest standards of living in the world. They often score highly on surveys measuring quality of life, such as the Human Development Index. Aside from the United Kingdom, they generally have a small population relative to their size, most of whom live in cities. The quality of education in much of Northern Europe is rated highly in international rankings, with Estonia and Finland topping the list among the OECD countries in Europe.

Language
Germanic languages are widely spoken in Northern Europe with North Germanic languages being the most common first language in the Faroe Islands (Faroese), Iceland (Icelandic), Denmark (Danish), Norway (Norwegian) and Sweden (Swedish). The West Germanic language English is the most common first language in Jersey, Guernsey, the Isle of Man, the United Kingdom and the Republic of Ireland, however, the West Germanic language Scots is also spoken as a minority language in parts of Scotland and Ireland. Beyond this, the Finnic languages of Finnish and Estonian are the most common first languages of Finland and Estonia respectively. The Baltic languages of Lithuanian and Latvian are the most common first languages of Lithuania and Latvia respectively. A number of Celtic languages are spoken in the British Isles including the Brythonic Welsh and the Goidelic Scots Gaelic and Irish. The Celtic languages Cornish and Manx have been revived since becoming classed as extinct, being now spoken to a limited extent in Cornwall and the Isle of Man respectively. The Norman languages of Jèrriais and Guernésiais are spoken in Jersey and Guernsey, though are listed as endangered due to the increasing prominence of English in the islands.

While not the most common first languages in any country, Sámi languages such as North Sámi, Lule Sámi and South Sámi are spoken in the transnational region of Sápmi and are listed as endangered.

Religion

During the Early Middle Ages, the Roman Catholic Church expanded into Northern Europe and spread Christianity among the Germanic peoples. Christianity reached the peoples of Scandinavia and the Baltic region in later centuries. The Latin alphabet along with the influence of Western Christianity spread northward from Rome, leading to written English, German, Dutch, Danish, Norwegian, Swedish, Icelandic, Latvian, Estonian, Finnish and Sami languages. The Sámi were the last peoples to be converted in the 18th century. 

During the Reformation, which began in Northern Europe according to some looser definitions of the region, Protestantism was embraced in Northern Europe to an extent unseen in other parts of Europe,  and the vast majority of Northern European countries, by any definition, are mostly Protestant historically, although many are non-practising. There are also growing numbers of non-religious people and people of other religions, especially Muslims, due to open immigration policies. In the United Kingdom, there are also significant numbers of Indian religions such as Hindus and Sikhs, due to the large South Asian diaspora.

Regional cooperation
The Hansa group in the European Union comprises most of the Northern European states, plus the Netherlands.

See also

 Archaeology of Northern Europe
 Arctic
 Arctic Circle
 Baltic region
 Baltic states
 Baltoscandia
 British Isles
 Celtic nations
 Central Europe
 Council of the Baltic Sea States
 Crown Dependencies
 Eastern Europe
 European Free Trade Association
 Euroregion Baltic
 Finno-Ugric countries
 List of Intangible Cultural Heritage elements in Northern Europe
 List of World Heritage Sites in Northern Europe
 New Hanseatic League
 Nordic-Baltic Eight
 Nordic Battlegroup
 Nordic Council
 Nordic countries
 Nordic cross flag
 Nordic Estonia
 North Sea Region
 Northern Dimension
 Northern European Gymnastics Championships
 Northern Future Forum
 Northwestern Europe
 OTSEM
 Roadex Project
 Southern Europe
 UK Joint Expeditionary Force
 Vifanord
 Western Europe

References

External links